The "cursed soldiers" (also known as "doomed soldiers", "accursed soldiers" or "damned soldiers") or "indomitable soldiers" is a term applied to a variety of anti-Soviet imperialist and anti-communist Polish resistance movements formed in the later stages of World War II and its aftermath by members of the Polish Underground State. This all-encompassing term for a widely heterogeneous movement was introduced in the early 1990s.

The clandestine organisations continued their armed struggle against the communist regime of Poland well into the 1950s. The guerrilla warfare included an array of military attacks launched against the regime's prisons and state security offices, detention facilities for political prisoners, and concentration camps that were set up across the country. Most of the Polish anti-communist groups ceased to exist in the late 1950s, as they were hunted down by agents of the Ministry of Public Security and Soviet NKVD. The last known "cursed soldier", Józef Franczak, was killed in an ambush in 1963.

The best-known Polish anti-communist resistance organisations operating in Stalinist Poland included Freedom and Independence (Wolność i Niezawisłość, WIN), National Armed Forces (Narodowe Siły Zbrojne, NSZ), National Military Union (Narodowe Zjednoczenie Wojskowe, NZW), Konspiracyjne Wojsko Polskie (Underground Polish Army, KWP), Ruch Oporu Armii Krajowej (Home Army Resistance, ROAK), Armia Krajowa Obywatelska (Citizens' Home Army, AKO), NIE (NO, short for Niepodległość), Armed Forces Delegation for Poland (Delegatura Sił Zbrojnych na Kraj), and Wolność i Sprawiedliwość (Freedom and Justice, WiS).

Similar Eastern European anti-communist insurgencies went on in neighbouring countries.

The operations and history of the "cursed soldiers" have been controversial.

Historical background

In the summer of 1944, as Soviet forces fighting against Nazi Germany advanced into Poland, the USSR set up a provisional puppet regime of Poland called the Polish Committee of National Liberation. The new regime was aware that the Polish Resistance (whose chief component was the Armia Krajowa or Home Army) and Underground State loyal to the Polish government-in-exile would have to be destroyed before they could gain complete control over Poland. Władysław Gomułka, future General Secretary of the Polish United Workers' Party, said that "Soldiers of the Armia Krajowa (AK) are a hostile element which must be removed without mercy". Another prominent communist, Roman Zambrowski, said that the AK had to be "exterminated".

The Armia Krajowa officially disbanded on 19 January 1945 to prevent a slide into armed conflict with the Red Army and the increasing threat of civil war over Poland's sovereignty. However, many resistance units decided to continue with their struggle for Polish independence, regarding Soviet forces as new occupiers. Soviet partisans in Poland had already been ordered by Moscow on 22 June 1943 to engage Polish partisans in combat.

According to Marek Jan Chodakiewicz's review of Bogdan Musial's Sowjetische Partisanen book, "Musial’s study suggests that the Soviets seldom attacked German military and police targets. They preferred to assault the poorly armed and trained Belarusan and Polish self-defense forces. The guerrillas torched and leveled Polish landed estates much more frequently than they blew up military transports and assaulted other hard targets." The main forces of the Red Army (Northern Group of Forces) and the NKVD began conducting operations against the Armia Krajowa (AK) during and directly after the launch of Operation Tempest, the aim of which was for the Polish resistance to seize control of cities and areas occupied by the Germans while the latter were preparing their defenses against the advancing Soviets. The Soviet leader Joseph Stalin planned to ensure that an independent Poland would never reemerge in the postwar period.

Formation of the anti-communist underground

The first AK structure designed primarily to deal with the Soviet threat was NIE (short for niepodległość "independence", and also meaning "no"), formed in mid-1943. NIE's goal was to observe and conduct espionage while the Polish government-in-exile decided how to deal with the Soviets, rather than to engage in combat. At that time, the exiled government still believed that negotiations could result in a solution leading to Poland's post-war independence.

On 7 May 1945, NIE was disbanded and transformed into the Delegatura Sił Zbrojnych na Kraj ("Armed Forces Delegation for Homeland"). This organization lasted only until August 8, 1945, when the decision was made to disband it and to stop partisan resistance on Polish territory.

In March 1945 a staged trial of 16 leaders of the Polish Underground State, who had been captured and imprisoned by the Soviet Union, took place in Moscow (the Trial of the Sixteen). The Government Delegate, together with most members of the Council of National Unity and the Commander-in-Chief of the Armia Krajowa, were invited by Soviet general Ivan Serov, with the agreement of Joseph Stalin, to a conference on their eventual entry into the Soviet-backed Provisional Government. They were presented with a warrant of safety, but the NKVD arrested them in Pruszków on 27 and 28 March. Leopold Okulicki, Jan Stanisław Jankowski, and Kazimierz Pużak were arrested on 27 March, and 12 more the following day. Alexander Zwierzynski had already been detained earlier. They were all taken to the Lubyanka prison in Moscow for interrogation prior to the trial. After several months of brutal interrogation and torture, they were charged with false accusations of "collaboration with Nazi Germany" and of "planning a military alliance with Nazi Germany".

The Polish Committee of National Liberation declined jurisdiction over former AK soldiers. Consequently, for more than a year, Soviet agencies such as the NKVD dealt with the AK. By the end of the war, approximately 60,000 soldiers of the AK had been arrested, and 50,000 of them were deported to the Soviet Union's prisons and prison camps. Most of those soldiers had been captured by the Soviets during or in the aftermath of Operation Tempest when many AK units tried to cooperate with the Red Army during their nationwide uprising against the Germans.

Other veterans were arrested when they approached the communist authorities after being promised amnesty. In 1947, the regime of the People's Republic of Poland proclaimed an amnesty for most of the wartime resistance fighters. The authorities expected around 12,000 people to give up their arms, but the total number of partisans to come out of the forests eventually reached 53,000. Many of them were arrested despite the promises of freedom. After repeated broken promises during the first few years of communist rule, former AK members refused to trust the government.

After the Delegatura Sił Zbrojnych na Kraj ("Armed Forces Delegation for Homeland") was disbanded, another post-AK resistance organisation was formed, called Wolność i Niezawisłość ("Freedom and Sovereignty"). Wolność i Niezawisłość (WiN) was most concerned with helping former AK soldiers make the transition from life as partisans to that of civilians, rather than any type of combat. Continued secrecy and conspiracy were necessary in light of the increasing persecution of AK veterans by the communist regime. WiN was, however, much in need of funds to pay for false documents and to provide resources for the partisans, many of whom had lost their homes and entire life-savings in the war. Viewed as enemies of the state, starved of resources, and with a vocal faction advocating armed resistance against the Soviets and their Polish proxies, WiN was far from efficient. A significant victory for the NKVD and the newly created Polish secret police, Urząd Bezpieczeństwa (UB), came in the second half of 1945 when they convinced several leaders of WiN that they truly wanted to offer amnesty to AK members. Within a few months, intelligence gathered by the authorities led to thousands more arrests. The primary period of WiN activity lasted until 1947. The organisation finally disbanded in 1952.

Persecution

The NKVD and UB used brute force and deception to eliminate the underground opposition. In the autumn of 1946, a group of 100–200 "cursed soldiers" of Narodowe Siły Zbrojne (National Armed Forces, NSZ) were lured into a trap and massacred. In 1947, Colonel Julia ("Bloody Luna") Brystiger of the Polish Ministry of Public Security proclaimed at a security briefing that: "the terrorist and political underground" had ceased to be a threatening force for the UB, although the "class enemy" at universities, offices and factories still had to be "found out and neutralised."

The persecution of AK members was only one aspect of the reign of Stalinist terror in postwar Poland. In the period from 1944 to 1956, at least 300,000 Polish civilians were arrested. Some sources claim numbers up to two million arrested. Approximately 6,000 death sentences were issued, and the majority of them were carried out. It is probable that more than 20,000 people died in communist prisons including those executed "in the majesty of the law", such as Witold Pilecki, a hero of Auschwitz.

A further six million Polish citizens (i.e., one out of every three adult Poles) were classified as suspected members of a 'reactionary or criminal element' and subjected to investigation by state agencies. During the Polish October of 1956, a political amnesty freed 35,000 former AK soldiers from prisons. But, some partisans remained in service, unwilling or simply unable to rejoin the civilian community. The cursed soldier Stanisław Marchewka "Ryba" ("The Fish") was killed in 1957, and the last AK partisan, Józef Franczak "Lalek" ("Doller"), was killed in 1963 — almost two decades after the Second World War ended. In 1967, long after the abolition of Stalinist terror, Adam Boryczka, the last member of the elite British-trained Cichociemny ("The Silent and Hidden") intelligence and support group, was finally released from prison. Until the end of the People's Republic of Poland, former AK soldiers were under constant investigation by the secret police. It was only in 1989, after the fall of communism, that the convictions of AK soldiers were finally declared invalid and annulled by Polish law.

The largest operations and actions

The biggest battle in the history of the National Military Union (Narodowe Zjednoczenie Wojskowe, NZW) took place on 6–7 May 1945, in the village of Kuryłówka in southeastern Poland. In the Battle of Kuryłówka, the partisans fought against the Soviet 2nd Border Regiment of the NKVD, gaining a victory for the underground forces commanded by Major Franciszek Przysiężniak ("Marek"). The anti-communist fighters killed up to 70 Soviet agents. The NKVD troops retreated in haste, only to return to the village later and burn it to the ground in retaliation, destroying over 730 buildings.

On 21 May 1945, a heavily armed AK unit led by Colonel Edward Wasilewski, attacked and destroyed the NKVD camp located in Rembertów on the eastern outskirts of Warsaw. The Soviets had incarcerated hundreds of Polish citizens there, including members of the Armia Krajowa.

Pacification
One of the biggest anti-partisan operations by the communist authorities took place from 10 to 25 June 1945, in and around the Suwałki and Augustów regions of Poland. The "Augustów roundup" was a joint operation of the Red Army, the Soviet NKVD, and SMERSH battalions, with assistance from Polish UB and LWP units, against Armia Krajowa resistance fighters. The operation extended into the territory of occupied Lithuania. More than 2,000 suspected anti-communist Polish fighters were captured and detained in Soviet internment camps. About 600 of the "Augustów Missing" are presumed to have died in Soviet custody, their bodies buried in unknown mass graves on the present territory of Russia. The Polish Institute of National Remembrance has declared the 1945 Augustów roundup to be "the largest crime committed by the Soviets on Polish lands after World War II."

Anti-communist resistance organizations
Among the best-known Polish underground organizations, engaged in guerrilla warfare were:
 Wolność i Niezawisłość ("Freedom and Independence", WIN) founded on September 2, 1945, active to 1952.
 Narodowe Siły Zbrojne ("National Armed Forces", NSZ) created on September 20, 1942, split in March 1944.
 Narodowe Zjednoczenie Wojskowe ("National Military Union", NZW) established in mid-to-late 1940s, active until mid-1950s.
 Konspiracyjne Wojsko Polskie ("Underground Polish Army", KWP) which existed from April 1945 to as late as 1954.
 Ruch Oporu Armii Krajowej ("Resistance of the Home Army", ROAK) formed in 1944 against UB collaborators.
 Armia Krajowa Obywatelska ("Citizens' Home Army", AKO) founded in February 1945, incorporated into Wolność i Niezawisłość in 1945.
 NIE ("NO") formed in 1943, active till 7 May 1945.
 Delegatura Sił Zbrojnych na Kraj ("Delegature of the Polish Forces at Home") formed on May 7, 1945, dissolved on August 8, 1945.
 Wolność i Sprawiedliwość ("Freedom and Justice", WIS) founded in early 1950s.

Events
Battle of Kuryłówka
Augustów roundup
Attack on the NKVD Camp in Rembertów
1951 Mokotow Prison executions
Raid on Kielce Prison

Notable members
The following list (in most part), was taken from the book Not Only Katyń (Nie tylko Katyń) by Ireneusz Sewastianowicz and Stanisław Kulikowski (Białostockie Wydawn. Prasowe, 1990); Part 10: "The Augustow Missing," compiled by the Citizen Committee for Search of Suwałki Region Inhabitants who Disappeared in July 1945 (Obywatelski Komitet Poszukiwań Mieszkańców Suwalszczyzny Zaginionych w Lipcu 1945 r., in Polish).

Cpt. Józef Batory (noms de guerre, "Argus" and "Wojtek")
Lt. Stefan Bembiński ("Harnaś")
Maj. Marian Bernaciak ("Orlik" and "Dymek")
Lt. Ksawery Błasiak ("Albert")
Cpt. Franciszek Błażej ("Roman", "Bogusław", and "Tadeusz")
Lt. Stanisław Bogdanowicz ("Tom")
Lt. Col. Janusz Bokszczanin ("Sęk")
Lt. Stefan Bronowski ("Roman")
Cpt. Zdzisław Broński ("Uskok")
Cpl Izydor Bukowski ("Burza")
Lt. Karol Chmiel ("Grom" and "Zygmunt")
Lt. Kazimierz Chmielowski ("Rekin")
Lt. Col. Łukasz Ciepliński ("Pług" and "Ostrowski")
Maj./Lt. Col. of NSZ Tadeusz Danilewicz ("Kuba", "Doman", "Kossak", and "Łoziński")
Maj. Hieronim Dekutowski ("Zapora")
Cpt. Jan Karol Dubaniowski ("Salwa")
2nd Lt. Władysław Dubielak ("Myśliwy")
Brig. Gen.Emil August Fieldorf ("Nil")
Cpt. Henryk Flame ("Bartek" and "Grot")
Józef Franczak ("Lalek")
Lt. Henryk Glapiński ("Klinga")
Lt. Eugeniusz Godlewski ("Topór")
Maj. Antoni Heda ("Szary")
Lt. Col. Tadeusz Jachimek ("Ninka")
Lt. Franciszek Jerzy Jaskulski ("Zagończyk")
2nd Lt. Henryk Jóźwiak ("Groźny")
Cpt. Kazimierz Kamieński ("Huzar")
2nd Lt./Lt. Col of NSZ Stanisław Kasznica ("Wąsowski", "Przepona", and "Wąsal")
Lt. Col. Mieczysław Kawalec ("Iza", "Psarski", and "Bronek")
Lt. Jan Kempiński ("Błysk")
Lt. Stefan Kobos ("Wrzos")
Cpt. Jan Kosowski ("Ciborski")
Lt. Karol Kazimierz Kostecki ("Kostek")
Lt. Jan Kłyś ("Kłyś")
Lt. Michał Krupa ("Wierzba" and "Pulkownik")
Col./Brig. Gen. (posthumous recognition) Aleksander Krzyżanowski ("Wilk")
Cpt. Ludwik Kubik ("Alfred", "Julian", and "Lucjan")
Lt. Józef Kuraś ("Ogień")
2nd Lt. Adam Kusz ("Garbaty")
2nd Lt. Władysław Kuśmierczyk ("Longinus")
Lt. Col. Wincenty Kwieciński ("Głóg")
Maj. Adam Lazarowicz ("Klamra", "Pomorski", "Kleszcz", and "Zygmunt")
Lt. Col. Henryk Lewczuk ("Młot")
Lt. Col. Władysław Liniarski ("Mścisław", "Wuj", and "Jan")
Lt. Stanisław Łukasik ("Ryś")
Cpt. Władysław Łukasiuk ("Młot")
Lt. Col. Józef Maciołek ("Żuraw", "Kazimierz", "Marian", and "Roch")
Cpt. Jan Marawca ("Remiusz")
2nd Lt. Stanisław Marchewka ("Ryba")
Lt. Józef Marcinkowski ("Łysy")
2nd Lt. Lucjan Minkiewicz ("Wiktor")
Maj. Kazimierz Mirecki ("Zmuda")
Cpt. Lech Neyman ("Domarat")
2nd Lt. Mieczysław Niedzielski ("Men" and "Grot")
Col. Franciszek Niepokólczycki ("Szubert")
Lt. Wiktor Zacheusz Nowowiejski ("Jeż")
Lt. Col. Antoni Olechnowicz ("Lawicz", "Pohorecki")
Maj. Mieczysław Pazderski ("Szary")
Lt. Stanisław Pelczer ("Majka")
Cpt. Witold Pilecki ("Witold")
Lt. Franciszek Przysiężniak ("Ojciec Jan")
Cpt. Romuald Rajs ("Bury")
Lt. Col. Albin Rak ("Lesiński")
Lt. Józef Ramatowski ("Rawicz")
Cpt. Wacław Rejmak ("Ostoja")
Maj. Zygmunt Rogalski ("Kacper")
Lt. Jan Rogólka ("Grot")
Col. Kazimierz Rolewicz ("Kama", "Ira", "Oko", "Mila", "Olgierd", "Zbyszek", and "Solski")
Lt. Lechosław Roszkowski ("Tomasz")
Lt. Col. Józef Rybicki ("Mestwin")
Maj. Aleksander Rybnik ("Jerzy" and "Dziki")
Maj. Józef Rządzki ("Boryna")
Lt. Józef Rzepka("Krzysztof" and "Znicz")
Col. Antoni Sanojca ("Kortum")
Lt. Col. Stanisław Sędziak ("Wiatr" and "Warta")
Danuta Siedzikówna ("Inka")
Cpt. Stanisław Sojczyński ("Warszyc")
Sgt. Władysław Stefanowski ("Grom")
Maj. Stanisław Szacoń ("Szacun")
Lt. Col. Jan Szczurek-Cergowski ("Sławbor")
Maj. Zygmunt Szendzielarz ("Łupaszko")
2nd Lt. Teodor Śmiałowski ("Szumny", "Grom", and "Cichy")
Franciszek Andrulewicz, his sister Janina and cousin Witold were also murdered; and the family had already lost at least one relative at the hands of the Nazis.
Maj. Jan Tabortowski ("Bruzda")
2nd Lt. Edward Taraszkiewicz ("Żelazny")
2nd Lt. Leon Taraszkiewicz ("Jastrząb")
Lt. Col. Walerian Tumanowicz ("Jagodziński")
2nd Lt. Edmund Tudruj ("Mundek")
2nd Lt. Eugeniusz Walewski ("Zemsta")
Cpt. Józef Zadzierski ("Wołyniak")
2nd Lt. Jerzy Zakulski ("Czarny Mecenas")
Lt. Wacław Grabowski ("Puszczyk")
Mieczysław Dziemieszkiewicz ("Rój")

Gallery

Cultural references
The "cursed soldiers" served as an inspiration for numerous films, documentaries, books, stage plays, and songs and, in Poland, they have become the ultimate symbol of patriotism and heroic fight for fatherland against all odds. Notable examples include:

Film

In 1958, Andrzej Wajda directed the film Ashes and Diamonds whose main protagonist, Maciek Chełmicki, is a member of the anti-Communist underground in Poland.
In 1990, Tadeusz Pawlicki directed a documentary film entitled Witold, which is dedicated to the life of Witold Pilecki, the author of Witold's Report, the first comprehensive intelligence report on the atrocities committed at the Auschwitz concentration camp. The film features interviews with Pilecki's wife and his children Zofia and Andrzej. It was broadcast on TVP2 and TVP Historia television channels.
In 1995, Alina Czerniakowska directed a documentary in collaboration with historian Leszek Żebrowski on the Polish anti-communist underground after the end of World War II entitled Zwycięstwo ("Victory"). 
In 1996, Tadeusz Pawlicki, directed the film My, ogniowe dzieci, telling the story of Józef Kuraś alias Ogień ("Fire").
In 2000, Mariusz Pietrowski, directed Łupaszko, a documentary film on the life of major Zygmunt Szendzielarz (known as Łupaszko).
In 2002, Grzegorz Królikiewicz directed a documentary film devoted to the life of Józef Kuraś entitled A potem nazwali go bandytą ("And Then They Called Him a Bandit...").
In 2004, a documentary Against the Odds: Resistance in Nazi Concentration Camps was produced. It features the story of Witold Pilecki.
In 2007, Jerzy Zalewski's film Elegia na śmierć Roja is dedicated to portraying the history of Mieczysław Dziemieszkiewicz.
In 2008, Discovery Historia channel broadcast a two-part documentary entitled In the Name of the Polish People's Republic.
In 2009, a documentary series Cursed Soldiers was produced by Discovery Historia.
In 2013, Dariusz Walusiak's film Escape from Hell. Tracing the Steps of Witold Pilecki is dedicated to the escape of Witold Pilecki, Jan Redzeja and Edward Ciesielski from the notorious Auschwitz concentration camp.
In 2014, Heroes of War: Poland was produced by Sky Vision for the History Channel UK and features the life of Witold Pilecki.
In 2015, the TVP channel produced a documentary film Inka. Zachowałam się jak trzeba directed by Arkadiusz Gołebiewski and portraying the life of Danuta Siedzikówna, a Polish medical orderly in the 4th Squadron of the 5th Wilno Brigade in Home Army who was captured, tortured and sentenced to death at the age of 17 by the communist authorities.
2016 saw the premiere of Jerzy Zalewski's film Historia Roja starring Krzysztof Zalewski as the main character.
In 2017, Konrad Łęcki directed Wyklęty ("The Cursed"), a film based on the life of anti-communist resistance member Józef Franczak.

Music
In 1996, Leszek Czajkowski's album Śpiewnik oszołoma was published which includes a number of songs dedicated to the memory of the "cursed soldiers".
In 2009, a Polish-Norwegian punk rock band De Press released an album Myśmy rebelianci ("We Are Rebels") honouring the legacy of the "cursed soldiers".
In 2011, Polish hip-hop artist Tadek released a single "Żołnierze wyklęci" to pay tribute to the members of the anti-communist underground operating after the end of the Second World War in Poland.
In 2011, a hip hop band Hemp Gru, released an album Loyalty, which features a single "Forgotten Heroes". 
In 2012, Obłęd band released an album entitled 100% Obłęd featuring a single dediacted to the Cursed Soldiers.
In 2013, Polish rapper Ptaku released an album NaRa featuring a single "Żołnierze Wyklęci" with references to the lives of Józef Kuraś, Ryszard Kukliński and Rafał Gan-Ganowicz.
2013 saw the release of an album Panny wyklęte, a music project by Dariusz Malejonek in collaboration with Polish singers including Marika, Natalia Przybysz and Halina Mlynkova devoted to the contribution of female members of the anti-communist movement. 
In 2013, rapper Evtis released three singles inspired by the history of the Cursed Soldiers: "The Volunteer" (referring to Witold Pilecki), "Indomitable Heroes" (referring to Stanisław Sojczyński, Łukasz Ciepliński and Hieronim Dekutowski), and "You Acted Right" (referring to Danuta Siedzikówna).
In 2013, Forteca band released an album Kto dziś upomni się o pamięć.
In 2014, Joined band released a single "Zabrali mi ciebie Tato" ("They Took You Away From Me, Dad") devoted to the murdered soldiers of the anti-communist underground.
In 2014, Swedish heavy metal band Sabaton paid tribute to Witold Pilecki in the single "Inmate 4859".
In 2015, Horytnica band released a single "Rój", referring to Mieczysław Dziemieszkiewicz, one of the Cursed Soldiers.

Theatre
On 15 May 2006, a stage production Śmierć rotmistrza Pileckiego ("The Death of Captain Pilecki") directed by Ryszard Bugajski and starring Marek Probosz had its premiere. 
On 22 January 2007, a play Inka. 1946 produced by Teatr Telewizji and diredcted by Natalia Koryncka-Gruz had its premiere in Poland.

Books
In 2016, Polish historian Lech Kowalski published a monumental 1,100 page book Korpus Bezpieczeństwa Wewnętrznego a Żołnierze Wyklęci (English: "Internal Security Corps and the Cursed Soldiers"), which focuses on the fight undertaken by the communist state authorities against Poland's anti-Communist underground in the years 1944–1956.
In 2019, Jack Fairweather published a book The Volunteer: One Man's Mission to Lead an Underground Army Inside Auschwitz and Stop the Holocaust whose subject is Witold Pilecki. His book won the Costa Book Awards – Book of the Year.

See also
Anti-Soviet partisans
Leśni
Forlorn hope
Forest Brothers
Japanese holdout

References

Further reading
Jerzy Ślaski, Żołnierze wyklęci, Warszawa, Oficyna Wydawnicza Rytm, 1996
Grzegorz Wąsowski and Leszek Żebrowski, eds., Żołnierze wyklęci: Antykomunistyczne podziemie zbrojne po 1944 roku, Warszawa, Oficyna Wydawnicza Volumen and Liga Republikańska, 1999
Kazimierz Krajewski et al., Żołnierze wyklęci: Antykomunistyczne podziemie zbrojne po 1944 r., Oficyna Wydawnicza Volumen and Liga Republikańska, 2002
Tomasz Łabuszewski, Białostocki Okręg AK- AKO : VII 1944-VIII 1945 (Warszawa: Oficzna Wydawnicza Volumen and Dom Wydawniczy Bellona, 1997)
Zrzeszenie “Wolność i Niezawisłość” w dokumentach, 6 vols. (Wrocław: Zarząd Główny WiN, 1997–2001)
Zygmunt Woźniczka, Zrzeszenie “Wolność i Niezawisłość” 1945-1952 (Warszawa: Instytut Prasy i Wydawnictw “Novum” – “Semex”, 1992)
Marek Latyński, Nie paść na kolana: Szkice o opozycji lat czterdziestych (London: Polonia Book Fund Ltd., 1985)

External links
 Short description of an exhibition on Łupaszko
 The Doomed soldiers - Polish Underground Soldiers 1944-1963 - The Untold Story
 WiN | Freedom and Independence - Historical Brief.
 NSZ | National Armed Forces - Historical Brief.
 Broader description
 ŻOŁNIERZE WYKLĘCI NA KRESACH POŁUDNIOWO-WSCHODNICH PO 1944 R.
 Antykomunistyczne Podziemie Zbrojne po 1944 roku
  Żołnierze wyklęci

 
Polish People's Republic
Anti-communism in Poland
Guerrilla organizations
Communism-based civil wars
Stalinism in Poland
Paramilitary organisations based in Poland
Anti-communist organizations